Communist Party of Nepal-Maoist may mean:
 Communist Party of Nepal (Revolutionary Maoist)
 Communist Party of Nepal (Maoist)
 Communist Party of Nepal (Biplab)